Aaron Davidson (born 1970/1971) is an American lawyer, businessman, and convicted fraudster.

Davidson is the former chairman of the board of governors of the North American Soccer League, and former president of Traffic Sports USA. The Brazilian José Hawilla, owner and founder of Traffic Group, appointed Davidson to be the head of his company's North American headquarters in 2003. His job was to pay millions of dollars in bribes to decision makers, following their South American operating model, who then gave to Traffic Group marketing rights to sport events. For similar reasons, Enrique Sanz de Santamaría, did the same, thus after his unveiling Davidson could not avoid his revelation on May 6, 2015.

Davidson was one of 14 suspects indicted and detained in the 2015 FIFA corruption case. He was banned by the FIFA Ethics Committee. In May 2015, Davidson pleaded not guilty in Brooklyn Federal Court and was released on $5 million bond. Subsequently, in October 2016, Davidson pleaded guilty and forfeited $507,900 with sentencing set for October 3, 2019. In September 2018, FIFA’s ethics committee imposed life ban on Davidson for bribery and corruption and a $1.03 million fine.

Early life
Both of his parents are first generation immigrants, and their parents are of eastern European Jewish ancestry. He describes himself as a "Tex-Mex-Costa Rican Jew".

Davidson was educated at Emory University and the Dedman School of Law at Southern Methodist University.

Career
Davidson is a licensed attorney in Texas and New York. His career has been entirely in the legal and commercial aspects of sports management. Davidson worked at the Muller Group, a marketing firm for sports in New York.

Personal life
Davidson is married to Michelle Dryjansky.

References

Emory University alumni
Living people
Dedman School of Law alumni
North American Soccer League executives
Businesspeople from Texas
Texas lawyers
21st-century American businesspeople
1970s births